The Beijing Schmidt CCD Asteroid Program (SCAP) was an astronomical survey to search for near-Earth objects. It was conducted during the 1990s, at the Xinglong Station in Xinglong County, Chengde, Hebei province, China  and resulted in the discovery of more than a thousand numbered minor planets.

Funded by the Chinese Academy of Science, the survey is sometimes also called BAO Schmidt CCD Asteroid Program and NAOC Schmidt CCD Asteroid Program, referring to the Beijing Astronomical Observatory (BAO) and National Astronomical Observatory of China (NAOC), respectively.

The instrument that SCAP used to detect near-Earth objects was a 60/90 cm Schmidt telescope. Equipped with a 2048×2048 CCD camera, this telescope was installed at the BAO Xinglong station in Hebei province, China.

In a conversation with Space.com contributor Michael Paine, SCAP head Jin Zhu said that the program's allotted time to use the Schmidt telescope was significantly reduced to make room for the observatory's other projects.

Discoveries 

From 1995 to 1999, SCAP detected one new comet and 2460 new asteroids and observed 43860 other asteroids, making it the fifth largest asteroid observation project at that time. Five of the asteroids it discovered were NEAs, two of which were considered potentially hazardous asteroids (PHAs). In 2002, an NEA was discovered near Earth's moon.

Notable objects

List of discovered minor planets

See also

References

External links 
 WELCOME TO Xinglong Station of NAOC webpage for the station where SCAP was conducted. It also shows a picture of the Schmidt telescope that SCAP used in its research.
 BAO ASTEROID OBSERVATIONS: From Astrometry To Physical Researcj 
 Bigger Telescopes Seek Killer Asteroids – a Space.com special report by Michael Paine on the search for near-Earth asteroids
 Asteroid Named to Mark CAS Anniversary - a Beijing Review article by Li Rongxia on asteroid 7800
 China Builds New Observatory To Detect Near-Earth Asteroids – a Spacedaily.com article by Wei Long on the Purple Mountain Observatory. The SCAP is briefly mentioned here.
 § 1.8 New Asteroids – Discovering and Cataloging describes the groups involved with asteroid detection. SCAP is briefly mentioned here.

Chinese Academy of Sciences
Astronomical discoveries by institution

Infrared telescopes
Minor-planet discovering observatories
Near-Earth object tracking
Space telescopes